The tiny settlement of Pūponga in New Zealand is the northernmost settlement in the South Island. The spit's airstrip, Triangle Flat Airstrip is just northeast of Pūponga. The settlement of Pūponga is inland; the settlement located on the coast is called Port Pūponga.

Just to the northeast of the village, a car park at a cafe is the starting point for tours of Farewell Spit. Popular walks in the area include short walks to Cape Farewell, the northernmost point of the South Island, and to Wharariki Beach.

References

Populated places in the Tasman District
Populated places around Golden Bay / Mohua